Wallgraben-Theater  is a theatre in Freiburg im Breisgau, Baden-Württemberg, Germany.

Theatres in Baden-Württemberg
Buildings and structures in Freiburg im Breisgau
Tourist attractions in Freiburg im Breisgau